In electrochemistry, the electrochemical potential (ECP), is a thermodynamic measure of chemical potential that does not omit the energy contribution of electrostatics. Electrochemical potential is expressed in the unit of J/mol.

Introduction
Each chemical species (for example, "water molecules", "sodium ions", "electrons", etc.) has an electrochemical potential (a quantity with units of energy) at any given point in space, which represents how easy or difficult it is to add more of that species to that location. If possible, a species will move from areas with higher electrochemical potential to areas with lower electrochemical potential; in equilibrium, the electrochemical potential will be constant everywhere for each species (it may have a different value for different species). For example, if a glass of water has sodium ions (Na+) dissolved uniformly in it, and an electric field is applied across the water, then the sodium ions will tend to get pulled by the electric field towards one side. We say the ions have electric potential energy, and are moving to lower their potential energy. Likewise, if a glass of water has a lot of dissolved sugar on one side and none on the other side, each sugar molecule will randomly diffuse around the water, until there is equal concentration of sugar everywhere. We say that the sugar molecules have a "chemical potential", which is higher in the high-concentration areas, and the molecules move to lower their chemical potential. These two examples show that an electrical potential and a chemical potential can both give the same result: A redistribution of the chemical species. Therefore, it makes sense to combine them into a single "potential", the electrochemical potential, which can directly give the net redistribution taking both into account.

It is (in principle) easy to measure whether or not two regions (for example, two glasses of water) have the same electrochemical potential for a certain chemical species (for example, a solute molecule): Allow the species to freely move back and forth between the two regions (for example, connect them with a semi-permeable membrane that lets only that species through). If the chemical potential is the same in the two regions, the species will occasionally move back and forth between the two regions, but on average there is just as much movement in one direction as the other, and there is zero net migration (this is called "diffusive equilibrium"). If the chemical potentials of the two regions are different, more molecules will move to the lower chemical potential than the other direction.

Moreover, when there is not diffusive equilibrium, i.e., when there is a tendency for molecules to diffuse from one region to another, then there is a certain free energy released by each net-diffusing molecule. This energy, which can sometimes be harnessed (a simple example is a concentration cell), and the free-energy per mole is exactly equal to the electrochemical potential difference between the two regions.

Conflicting terminologies 

It is common in electrochemistry and solid-state physics to discuss both the chemical potential and the electrochemical potential of the electrons. However, in the two fields, the definitions of these two terms are sometimes swapped. In electrochemistry, the electrochemical potential of electrons (or any other species) is the total potential, including both the (internal, nonelectrical) chemical potential and the electric potential, and is by definition constant across a device in equilibrium, whereas the chemical potential of electrons is equal to the electrochemical potential minus the local electric potential energy per electron. In solid-state physics, the definitions are normally compatible with this, but occasionally the definitions are swapped.

This article uses the electrochemistry definitions.

Definition and usage
In generic terms, electrochemical potential is the mechanical work done in bringing 1 mole of an ion from a standard state to a specified concentration and electrical potential. According to the IUPAC definition, it is the partial molar Gibbs energy of the substance at the specified electric potential, where the substance is in a specified phase.  Electrochemical potential can be expressed as

where:
 i is the electrochemical potential of species i, in J/mol,
 μi is the chemical potential of the species i, in J/mol,
 zi is the valency (charge) of the ion i, a dimensionless integer,
 F is the Faraday constant, in C/mol,
 Φ is the local electrostatic potential, in V.

In the special case of an uncharged atom, zi = 0, and so i = μi.

Electrochemical potential is important in biological processes that involve molecular diffusion across membranes, in electroanalytical chemistry, and industrial applications such as batteries and fuel cells. It represents one of the many interchangeable forms of potential energy through which energy may be conserved.

In cell membranes, the electrochemical potential is the sum of the chemical potential and the membrane potential.

Incorrect usage
The term electrochemical potential is sometimes used to mean an electrode potential (either of a corroding electrode, an electrode with a non-zero net reaction or current, or an electrode at equilibrium). In some contexts, the electrode potential of corroding metals is called "electrochemical corrosion potential", which is often abbreviated as ECP, and the word "corrosion" is sometimes omitted. This usage can lead to confusion. The two quantities have different meanings and different dimensions: the dimension of electrochemical potential is energy per mole while that of electrode potential is voltage (energy per charge).

See also
 Concentration cell
 Electrochemical gradient
 Fermi level
 Membrane potential
 Nernst equation
 Poisson–Boltzmann equation
 Reduction potential
 Standard electrode potential

References

External links
 Electrochemical potential – lecture notes from University of Illinois at Urbana-Champaign

Electrochemistry
Thermodynamics
Electrochemical potentials